The West Branch Union River is a river in Hancock County, Maine.

See also
List of rivers of Maine

References
Notes

Sources

Maine Streamflow Data from the USGS
Maine Watershed Data From Environmental Protection Agency

Rivers of Hancock County, Maine
Rivers of Maine